Joseph Messer Clough (June 15, 1828 – May 7, 1919) was a Union Army lieutenant colonel during the American Civil War, who was appointed and confirmed to the grade of brevet brigadier general of volunteers in 1866. 

Clough was born June 15, 1828 in Sunapee, New Hampshire. He attended Norwich University in Vermont. Clough led the City Guard of Manchester, New Hampshire, and was a member of the City Guard at Lowell, Massachusetts. He was a machinist and mill operator before the Civil War.

On April 26, 1861, he enlisted in the Union Army as a private with the 1st New Hampshire Volunteer Infantry, a 90-day regiment, and was soon appointed a lieutenant. The regiment was mustered out in August, 1861. On September 18, 1861, Clough was appointed captain in the 4th New Hampshire Volunteer Infantry Regiment. On July 30, 1864, he was wounded in the mine explosion at Petersburg, Virginia. On October 18, 1864, Clough became a lieutenant colonel with the 10th New Hampshire Volunteer Infantry Regiment. In March 1865, he was wounded at Fort Stedman. Clough was mustered out of the volunteers on July 29, 1865.

On July 9, 1866, President Andrew Johnson nominated Clough for appointment to the grade of brevet brigadier general of volunteers, to rank from March 13, 1865, and the United States Senate confirmed the appointment on July 23, 1866. In 1909, Clough was appointed to the rank of major general in the state militia by New Hampshire Governor Henry B. Quinby.

After the Civil War Clough was a farmer and railroad mail agent. Joseph Messer Clough died in New London, New Hampshire on May 7, 1919. He was buried in Montcalm Cemetery, Enfield Center, New Hampshire.

References

See also

List of American Civil War brevet generals (Union)

1828 births
1919 deaths
Union Army officers
People of New Hampshire in the American Civil War
People from Sunapee, New Hampshire